This page includes full the discography of the Ukrainian artist Ruslana, including albums and singles, in both Ukrainian and English languages.

Ruslana's discography

Studio albums

EP

Other albums

DVDs

English Singles

Ukrainian singles

Unreleased songs 
 "Drum 'n' Dance"
 "Wind Song"

Soundtracks 
Soundtracks containing Ruslana songs.
 2007: Heartbreak Hotel Soundtrack - "Dance with the Wolves"
 2007: Heartbreak Hotel Soundtrack - "Wild Dances Part II"
 2008: Grand Theft Auto IV - "Wild Dances"
 2012: How I Became an Elephant - "Smak legendy"

Music videos 
 "Ty" (1998)
 "Myt Vesny - Dzvinkyi Viter" (1998)
 "Svitanok" (1998)
 "Balada pro pryntsesu" (1998)
 "Kolyskova" (1998)
 "Znayu Ya" (2000)
 "Proschannia z dysko" (2001)
 "Dobryi vechir, tobi..." (2002)
 "Kolomyika" (2003)
 "Oi, Zahraimy, Muzychenku" (2003)
 "Wild Dances" (2004)
 "Dance with the Wolves" (2004)
 "Ring Dance with the Wolves" (2005)
 "The Same Star" (2005)
 "U rytmi sertsia" (2005)
 "Dyka Enerhiya" (2006)
 "Vidlunnia mriy" [Ukr. version of "Moon of Dreams"] (2008)
 "Moon of Dreams" (feat. T-Pain) (2008)
 "Vohon chy lid" (2008)
 "Silent Angel" (2009)
 "Wow" (2011)
 "Sha-la-la" (2011)
 "Davaj, graj!" (2012)
 "Miy brat" (2012)
 "Tse Ey-fori-ya" (2012)
 "Rachmaninoff" (2012)
 "WOW (English Version)" (2013)
 "Sha-la-la (English Version)" (2013)
 "This Is Euphoria" (2013)
 "Rachmaninoff (English Version)" (2013)

References

External links 
 

Discographies of Ukrainian artists
Pop music discographies